The 2010 Australian GT Championship was a CAMS sanctioned Australian motor racing championship open to closed production based sports cars which were either approved by the FIA for GT3 competition or approved by CAMS as Australian GTs. The championship, which was the 14th Australian GT Championship, incorporated drivers titles in three divisions, GT Championship, GT Challenge and GT Production. The Australian GT Sportscar Group Pty Ltd was appointed as the Category Manager by CAMS for the championship, which was promoted as the "Vodka O Australian GT Championship".

Defending champion David Wall became the first multiple championship winner in the history of the title with a 30-point victory over fellow Porsche driver, James Koundouris. Wall, driving the family team's Porsche 911 GT3 Cup S, won five races and claimed round wins at Adelaide and Eastern Creek. Third places at Albert Park and at Bathurst were enough to hold off Phillip Island round winner Koundouris, even after being excluded from the first race at Sandown. Dean Grant (Lamborghini Gallardo and Mosler MT900) was third in the championship. Other round winners were Porsche driver Max Twigg, at Albert Park, and Tony Quinn. Quinn drove an Aston Martin DBRS9 and a Mosler MT900, winning the Bathurst round in the former and the Sandown round in the latter, allowing him to climb into fourth in the championship.

In the GT Challenge division, Shane Smollen took a 120-point win over fellow Porsche 911 GT3 drivers, Michael Loccisano and Ray Angus.

Chevrolet Corvette driver Paul Freestone came from behind at the final round of the series to defeat Tony Alford (Nissan GT-R) and take victory in the GT Production division. Mark O'Connor (Lotus Exige) was third.

Controversy erupted after two major accidents at the second round of the series, which supported the 2010 Australian Grand Prix. A multi-car accident caused heavy damage to several vehicles at the start of one race and resulted in changes to regulations for rolling restarts, which have had consequences beyond GT racing. Additionally a multi-car accident that occurred under yellow flag conditions saw penalties levied against Porsche drivers Ray Angus and Andrew Taplin after they tangled with a slow moving damaged car and the parked Ascari KZ1-R of John Bowe.

Teams and drivers

The following teams and drivers contested the 2010 Australian GT Championship.

Race calendar
The championship was contested over a six-round series.

Points system
Points were awarded in each division at each race according to the following table.

Within each division, each driver could count only his/her best five round results.

Championship standings

 Note: Within each division, each driver could count only his/her best five round results.
 Note: No points were awarded for Race 2 at the Albert Park round due to the race being declared with under 50% of the scheduled distance completed.
 Note: Hector Lester competed on an International licence and was not eligible for championship points.

Australian Tourist Trophy
The 2010 Australian Tourist Trophy was awarded by the Confederation of Australian Motor Sport to the driver accumulating the highest aggregate points total from the Eastern Creek and Phillip island "endurance" rounds of the championship. The title, which was the 21st Australian Tourist Trophy, was won by David Wall, driving a Porsche 911 GT3 Cup S Type 997.

References

External links
 Australian GT – Official website
 2010 Race Results Archive
 2010 Australian GT Championship Sporting & Technical Regulations as archived at www.webcitation.org

Australian GT Championship
GT Championship